Barac may refer to:
 Barak, a 12th Century BC ruler and judge of Ancient Israel
 Romanian Mioritic Shepherd Dog, aka Barac
 Caves of Barać, in Croatia

People
 Ante Barać (born 1980), Croatian footballer
 Antonio Barać (born 1997), Croatian racing cyclist
 Antun Barac (1894-1955), Croatian historian
 Boris Barać (born 1992), Croatian basketball player
 Ioan Barac (1776-1848), Romanian poet
 Jakub Barac (born 1996), Czech footballer
 Marko Barać (born 1989), Serbian basketball coach 
 Mateo Barać (born 1994), Croatian footballer 
 Pankracije Barać (born 1981), Croatian basketball player 
 Samir Barać (born 1973), Croatian water polo player
 Stanko Barać (born 1986), Croatian basketball player
 Valér Barač (1909-1991), Slovak athlete
 Verica Barać (1955-2012), Serbian lawyer

See also
 Barak (disambiguation)
 Baraq (disambiguation)
 Barack (disambiguation)
 Baracs, village in Hungary